The Crown Coach Corporation (founded as the Crown Carriage Company) is a defunct American bus manufacturer.  Founded in 1904, the company was best known for its Supercoach range of yellow school buses and motorcoaches; the former vehicles were marketed throughout the West Coast of the United States.  Competing alongside Gillig Corporation and similar its Gillig Transit Coach, the two companies supplied California with school buses nearly exclusively into the 1980s.

Crown also was the manufacturer of custom-built vehicles derived from its buses, including the Firecoach line of fire apparatus.

For 80 years, Crown was headquartered in Los Angeles, California; in 1984, the company relocated its headquarters and manufacturing to Chino, California, where it operated until its closure.   In March 1991, Crown Coach (then a subsidiary of GE Railcar) ended operations as a result of declining demand for school buses at the time.

History

1904–1920: Wagons to school buses
At the beginning of the 20th century, Don M. Brockway found himself working at the first hardware store in Los Angeles, California.  To supplement its income, the hardware store sold parts for wagons and carriages.  In 1904, Brockway founded his own company, as Crown Carriage Company began life producing horse-drawn carriages.  While the first vehicles were built in a wooden shed, the company moved to a brick factory in 1910.

After 1910, as carriages gradually became "horseless", Crown experimented with building truck bodies.  In 1916, the company built its first bus body for transit use; it was an open-air design heavily influenced by wagon design.  After World War I, Crown built its first body for school bus use.

1921–1949: Airplanes, metal bodies, and Supercoaches

In 1921, a major shift in company production occurred as Murillo M. ("Brock") Brockway, the son of the company founder, was put in charge of school bus production.  Viewing school buses as a growth market in the suburbs of southern California, Brockway discontinued all wagon production in favor of bus and truck body production.  To expand production and improve shipping of its vehicles, a much larger factory in Los Angeles was opened in 1923.

In pursuit of developing heavier-duty and higher-capacity school buses, Crown introduced the first school bus with dual rear wheels in 1927 (on a Reo chassis).  In 1930, it produced its first all-metal school bus body (on a Mack chassis), with a 43-passenger capacity.

In 1929, Aircraft Division of the Crown Carriage Co. licensed the Kinner Airster airframe and it was manufactured as the Crown B-3 between 1930 and 1933.

1932 would mark several major changes for the company.  As part of his taking over day-to-day operations of Crown from his father, MM Brockway introduced a ground-breaking school bus body; elements of its design would change school bus design forever.  To improve forward visibility, the new bus was a cab-forward design, with the driver sitting next to the engine and radiator.  To improve safety, the bus was designed with an integral chassis; the windows were mesh-reinforced safety glass.  Alongside the standard braking system, the bus also was equipped with two backup braking systems.

In 1935, the cab-forward school bus was updated and dubbed the Crown Supercoach.

For 1937, to increase seating capacity to 79 passengers, Crown produced its first mid-engine Supercoach; the bus came with a Hall-Scott gasoline engine.  In 1939, Crown acquired Moreland Motor Truck Company; as part of the acquisition, Crown moved to a larger factory in Los Angeles.  Additionally, the Supercoach was changed from a mid-engine to a rear-engine configuration for 1940.

During World War II, the production of Crown Coach was diverted towards military use; most bodies produced by the company were fire engine bodies for four-wheel drive truck chassis.  Following the war, the company returned to bus production, beginning design work on the 1948 Supercoach. As a side project, engineers at the company designed an all-new cabover fire engine, using the mid-engine chassis of the Supercoach bus.  The first Crown Firecoach prototype was completed in 1951, after two years of design work.  Alongside the initial pumper design, Crown developed several configurations of the Firecoach, including water tenders, tiller and ladder trucks, and quints (TeleSquirts).

In the United States during the years immediately following World War II, population growth of suburbs expanded, fueled by the post-war baby boom.  As that segment of the population entered school, demand for new schools (and school buses to transport their students) rapidly rose.  In 1946, Crown began development on a new mid-engine Supercoach.  Heavily influenced by motorcoach design, Crown intended it primarily for school bus use.  Introduced in 1949, the all-new Supercoach used unit-body construction with high-strength steel in place of a separate chassis; to combat corrosion, all body panels were aluminum.

To prove the durability of the Supercoach to potential customers, Crown offered the Supercoach with a 20-year/100,000 mile warranty for the body.

1950–1980: Mid-engine school buses 
During the mid-1950s, Crown made several changes to the Supercoach.  In 1954, the company made the Cummins NHH available as an option, producing the first diesel-engined school bus.  In 1955, Crown developed the largest school bus in the United States.  In expanding the bodyshell to 40 feet (then the maximum for both school buses and motorcoaches) and adding a second rear axle, Crown raised the seating capacity from 79 to 91 passengers.  As a later option, some school districts  ordered the Supercoach with a 16th row of seats, further expanding seating to 97 passengers; as with its Gillig counterpart, the 97-passenger Supercoach is the highest-capacity school bus ever sold in the United States.

From the 1950s to the 1970s, school bus production on the West Coast evolved separately from the rest of the United States, with the Crown Supercoach and the similar Gillig Transit Coach having a near-monopoly of the school bus segment in California and a large share of the rest of the West Coast.  Outside of the region, many operators continued use of lower-capacity conventional-type buses based upon truck chassis.  For users seeking lower-capacity buses on the West Coast, in place of developing an all-new model line from the ground up, both Crown and Gillig chose to serve as the West Coast distributor for other manufacturers.  At various times, Crown would market Wayne, Blue Bird, and Thomas Built Buses in California.

Sharing much of its underlying structure with the Crown school bus, the intercity Crown Supercoach was marketed with several configurations.  Along with an underfloor configuration, Crown also produced a rear-engine version, as well as a raised-floor configuration (along with a version similar to the Scenicruiser); the latter two provided for increased luggage space.  To supplement its motorcoach offerings, in 1969, Crown became one of the first distributors of Quebec-built Prevost motorcoaches in the United States.

The Firecoach was produced through the 1960s and 1970s with relatively few changes.  While sold primarily across the West Coast, examples of the Crown Firecoach were purchased by fire departments across the United States.  In 1965, a roof was made standard for all Firecoaches, in the interest of firefighter safety.

1980–1991: Decline 
In 1979, the Brockway family sold Crown Coach Corporation to a local truck distributor; this began a sequence of ownership changes.  Due to slow sales, Crown ended production of the motorcoach version of the Supercoach in 1980, focusing entirely on school buses.  By 1982, sales of the aging Firecoach had largely collapsed, leading to a temporary hiatus in its production.  After 34 years of production and with slightly over 1,800 examples produced, the final Firecoach was produced in 1985.

During 1984, Crown moved its headquarters and production from Los Angeles to Chino, California in San Bernardino County.  To diversify beyond the Supercoach-based product line, Crown entered into a joint venture with the Hungarian firm Ikarus to produce articulated mass-transit buses.  At 102 inches wide and 60 feet long, the Crown-Ikarus 286 was the longest and widest bus ever produced by Crown Coach.  Bodied by Ikarus in Hungary, the transit bus was imported to Crown in California for final assembly, including its interior and American-sourced powertrain (shared with the Supercoach).  In 1986, the partnership ended, with 243 examples produced.

At the end of 1986, Crown Coach entered into receivership; in addition to the closure of production, the Los Angeles factory (which it had owned since 1939) was sold.  In April 1987, the company was purchased at auction by GE Railcar.  After a reorganization as Crown Coach, Incorporated, production in Chino restarted in July 1987.

As the 1980s ended, the Crown Supercoach had reached over 40 years of production with only minor evolutionary changes made through its production.  In 1989, the California Energy Commission began a study to test low-emission school buses, using methanol-fueled vehicles as part of the test; Crown Coach was a manufacturer selected to take part of the study, using a methanol-fuel Detroit Diesel 6V92 engine.  The fitment of the engine required an extensive update of the rear bodywork of the Supercoach, leading to a matching update of the front bodywork.  Although not a completely new design, the Series II, as it was named, was the first major update to the Supercoach since 1948.

GE railcar would find the business unprofitable and would seek a buyer. After an unsuccessful attempt at finding a buyer in 1990, Crown Coach would be shut down on March 31, 1991. Crown's difficulty in competing with manufacturers of smaller, less durable but cheaper school buses was cited by company president Bruce Freeman in October 1990 as a primary factor in GE's decision to leave the school bus market. The assets of Crown Coach would be purchased by Carpenter Body Works in May 1991. This included tooling and intellectual property of the defunct company. Carpenter hoped to restart production of the Crown Supercoach II, but deemed the unibody construction too expensive for mass production. Carpenter would introduce the Carpenter RE, a similar coach to the Crown Supercoach in 1992.

Products

Buses

Fire apparatus

Other vehicles

References

External links

Crown Coach Historical Society - founded by Sandi Brockway
 Bruce Vanderhorst Crown Fire Engine Website
 Paul Krot's Crown Firecoach Photo Archive
 Chris Arnolds Crown Firecoach Website

Vehicle manufacturing companies established in 1904
Manufacturing companies disestablished in 1991
School bus manufacturers
Defunct bus manufacturers of the United States
Defunct companies based in Greater Los Angeles
Manufacturing companies based in Los Angeles
Fire service vehicle manufacturers